Flakne is a surname. Notable people with the surname include:

Gary Flakne (1934–2016), American politician
Gunn Elin Flakne (born 1964), Norwegian politician 
Torstein Flakne (born 1960), Norwegian singer and guitarist

See also
Flake (disambiguation)

Norwegian-language surnames